This is a list of common Feynman diagrams.

Particle physics
Physics-related lists